Indian Balsam may refer to:

Balsam of Peru, from Myroxylon, a genus of tree in the family Fabaceae
Impatiens glandulifera, a species of plant in the family Balsaminaceae